This is a list of bridges in Zhejiang, China.

Bridges

Beimen Bridge
Chien Tang River Bridge
Chuan Nanpu Bridge
Donghai Bridge
Guyue Bridge
Hangzhou Bay Bridge
Jiangdong Bridge
Jiantiao Bridge
Jiashao Bridge
Jintang Bridge
Jiubao Bridge under construction
Mingzhou Bridge
Pont de Donghai
Qiandaohu Bridge
Qingfeng Bridge
Qingshuipu Bridge
Taoyaomen Bridge
Tongji Bridge (Jinhua)
Tongji Bridge (Yuyao)
Tongwamen Bridge
Waitan Bridge
Xiangshan Harbor Bridge
Xiasha Bridge
Xihoumen Bridge
Xijin Bridge
Zhaobaoshan Bridge

See also
List of bridges in China

Bridges in Zhejiang
Zhejiang